In enzymology, an alpha-factor-transporting ATPase is an enzyme that catalyzes the chemical reaction

ATP + H2O + alpha-factorin  ADP + phosphate + alpha-factorout

The 3 substrates of this enzyme are ATP, H2O, and alpha-factor, whereas its 3 products are ADP, phosphate, and alpha-factor.

This enzyme belongs to the family of hydrolases, specifically those acting on acid anhydrides to catalyse transmembrane movement of substances. The systematic name of this enzyme class is ATP phosphohydrolase (alpha-factor-transporting).

References 

 
 

EC 3.6.3
Enzymes of unknown structure